Manja Airport is an airport in Manja, Menabe Region, Madagascar .

Airlines and destinations

References

Airports in Madagascar
Menabe